Gerhard Mueller (7 February 1835 – 20 February 1918) was a notable New Zealand surveyor, engineer and land commissioner. He was born in Darmstadt, Germany on 7 February 1835.

References

1835 births
1918 deaths
New Zealand surveyors
German emigrants to New Zealand
Engineers from Darmstadt
20th-century New Zealand engineers
19th-century New Zealand engineers